Dharahara (or ), is a  tower at the centre of Sundhara, Kathmandu, Nepal. It was first built in 1832 by Mukhtiyar (equivalent to Prime Minister) Bhimsen Thapa under the commission of Queen Lalit Tripurasundari and was a part of the architecture of Kathmandu recognized by UNESCO. It has been damaged and reconstructed several times.

The tower had a spiral staircase containing 213 steps. The eighth floor held a circular balcony for observers that provided a panoramic view of the Kathmandu valley. It also had a  bronze mast on the roof.

Most of the tower collapsed in the 25 April 2015 Nepal earthquake, but the base remains. A total of 180 bodies were retrieved from the debris of tower after earthquake. Reconstruction of the tower commenced in October 2018, and it was officially opened on 24 April 2021, one day before the sixth anniversary of the earthquake.

History
Dharahara in Kathmandu was the tallest building in Nepal and the second such tower built by Bhimsen Thapa. The first tower was built eight years earlier in 1824 (1881 BS) at his residence, Janarala Bagh, situated at south-east of Sundhara, near Bhotebahal of Kathmandu. It got torn in half during the earthquake of 1834 and was never rebuilt. It was only a year later (in 1835) that Bhimsen Thapa built the second Dharahara, along with the Sundhara (the golden water spout), for Queen Lalit TripuraSundari Devi, who was the niece of Bhimsen Thapa.A century later, on 15 January 1934, another earthquake completely destroyed the first tower, and only two of the nine storeys of the second tower remained. The then Prime Minister of Nepal, Juddha Shumsher Jang Bahadur Rana, subsequently carried out renovation work of the Dharahara tower to fully restore it. After the original Bhimsen Tower was destroyed, Queen Lalit Tripurasundari's tower came to be known as Bhimsen Stambha.

The second tower was built in honour of Bhimsen Thapa's feat of taking Nepal's land back in the war. King Rajendra Bikram Shah had given a lalmohar (a document with the royal seal) to Bhimsen Thapa in 1835, acknowledging his Commander-in-Chief status and building of Dharahara in Sundhara in 1824, in his honour.

Dharahara was constructed for military usage as a watchtower. When incidents of national importance occurred, bugles were blown from the top floor of the tower. This was the signal for soldiers to assemble. This tradition of bugle trumpeting continued until the collapse of the tower. On one of the sign board at Dharahara, it is stated that the Dharahara's main purpose was to enable the state and city authorities to summon people to gather on the Tundikhel (the military parade ground to the northeast of the tower) to hear government announcements, and that it showed ‘the religious harmony between Hindu, Muslim and Christian faiths.'

Amongst the many myths Kathmandu is surrounded by, the most famous and fearsome Rana Prime Minister of Nepal, Jung Bahadur Rana. Legends has it that "The White Tiger" rode on a horse back and climbed upstairs to the balcony of the tower. What he did next was daring to many and plain stupid to some. He jumped off the balcony on the horseback! The horse died from the jump but "Jungey" survived. One of his daring acts among many.

2015 earthquake 

On 25 April 2015, at 11:56 NST, an earthquake with an estimated magnitude of 7.8, hit Kathmandu and its surrounding region, leading to the collapse of the tower. The structure collapsed and only its base survived. According to the people on the scene when the earthquake hit, the region was covered with clouds of smoke and the rubbles heard shouting. The Nepalese Army barricaded the entrance and launched the rescue mission. Some people were able to collect the remains of Dharahara bricks, probably to remember them. Those bricks were inscribed with the name of Juddha Shumsher, indicating that the tower was rebuilt during his tenure. More than 9,000 people were killed and 2.8 million were displaced. The image of Dharahara that fell during the earthquake in the 19th century, quickly became an iconic representation for many Nepalese not only of the catastrophe but also of their national determination to recuperate and rebuild it. When local people living far away from the epicenter heard that the Dharahara had fallen that they understood the scale of the calamity: they then realised that ‘the disaster was not small’. It was a total shock for Nepal and entire Nepalese people, regardless of their ethnicity, caste or gender, because Dharahara was the pre-eminent symbol of their capital city's, and therefore their nation's identity.

In February 2016, the government decided to rebuild the tower, and Prime Minister KP Sharma Oli and his cabinet ministers contributed one month's salary to the rebuilding. A fund called "I will construct Dharahara" was also established to collect money for the reconstruction. According to Sushil Gyawali, chief executive of the National Reconstruction Agency, the new tower will be earthquake-resistant. The foundation stone of the new tower was laid down on 27 December 2018.

Reconstruction and inauguration
The original one, built by the first prime minister of Nepal Bhimsen Thapa, was destroyed in the 1934 earthquake. Rana Prime minister Juddha Sumsher Rana reconstructed it which was destroyed by the April 2015 earthquake. Under the coordination of the National Reconstruction Authority, the Reconstruction of the monument took place.

The inauguration ceremony was organized on the eve of the sixth memorial day of the Gorkha earthquake which occurred on April 25, 2015. Reconstruction of the tower had begun in October 2018. Prime Minister KP Sharma Oli inaugurated the historical Bhimsensthmbha (Dharahara) on April 24, 2021, in Sundhara, Kathmandu.

Architecture
The architecture of Dharahara is designed in both Mughal and European style. It is widely believed that the original towers were modelled on monuments in India such as the minarets that stand at the four corners of the Taj Mahal complex at Agra, or the Qutb Minar in Delhi. Bhimsen Thapa was a known admirer of the Mughal style as is evident by his palace, now demolished, which was Mughal in style with a fair amount of Kathmandu Gothic thrown in. The main materials used in the tower construction were Vajra-Surki (Brick dust), Chuna (Lime), Maas (Black lentil) and Chaaku (Caramel). The combination of these materials are considered to be much stronger than the common cement used nowadays.

Before collapse
The tower was a major tourist attraction and was open to the public from 2005 until its collapse in 2015. The management of Dharahara before 2015 came under heavy scrutiny from locals and tourists. The Heritage Department of Kathmandu Metropolitan City was criticized for its lack of effort to protect the heritage site.

New tower 
On April 24, 2021, Prime Minister of Nepal officially inaugurated the opening of new replica Dharahara Tower which is built just at the side of old tower remains. Just like old tower, It also has gajur (bronze mast) on its top roof. It also has a museum, a garden and a fountain nearby its surrounding. It has two lifts with underground parking with capacity to accommodate 350 four-wheelers and 6,000 two-wheelers to make it more accessible. The tower is shaped like a minaret and offers views across the Kathmandu Valley. However, visitors will have to wait until later in the year to enjoy them, as there will be no access for the public until November. The total cost of the new tower is estimated to be at 3.48 billion Nepalese Rupees.

Gallery

See also 

 List of destroyed heritage
Architecture of Kathmandu

References

Towers in Kathmandu
Towers completed in 1832
Tourist attractions in Kathmandu
Bhimsen Thapa